Wilhelm Rietschel (26 January 1911 – 18 December 1941) was a German sculptor. His work was exhibited as part of the sculpture event in the art competition at the 1936 Summer Olympics. He was killed in action during the Siege of Leningrad.

References

1911 births
1941 deaths
People from Wurzen
20th-century German sculptors
20th-century German male artists
Summer Olympics competitors for Germany
German military personnel killed in World War II
Olympic competitors in art competitions
Sportspeople from Saxony